Chur is a city in Switzerland.

Chur or CHUR may also refer to:
Prince-Bishopric of Chur, an ecclesiastical principality in Switzerland, part of the Holy Roman Empire.
Roman Catholic Diocese of Chur, Switzerland
Chondritic uniform reservoir
Chur, Kurdistan, a village in Kurdistan Province, Iran
Chur, Stavropol Krai, a rural locality (an aul) in Stavropol Krai, Russia
Chur, Udmurt Republic, a rural locality (a settlement) in the Udmurt Republic, Russia
CHUR-FM, a radio station in North Bay, Ontario, Canada
269550 Chur, an asteroid